Podaxis pistillaris is a very distinctive relative of the puffballs. It is commonly known as the desert shaggy mane as it bears a resemblance to the shaggy mane, Coprinus comatus, however it does not possess deliquescing gills and the similar appearance is only superficial. It grows to 15 cm high and has a hard, woody stem. The large cap, which protects the blackish spore-bearing tissue, splits, and usually falls away at maturity, allowing the spores to be dispersed by wind. Large numbers may appear after soaking rains. It thrives in deserts and semi-deserts of Australia and other countries, often found on termite mounds in South Africa. In the Hawaiian Islands, it is frequently encountered along roadsides and in disturbed areas on the dry sides of the islands, especially in the Kona area of Hawaii and the Kihei area of Maui.

Older synonyms for this species include Lycoperdon pistillare L. (1771)  and Scleroderma pistillare (L.) Pers. (1801).

Spores
The spores are usually 10–14 (–16) by (8–) 9–12 µm broadly oval to sub-globose, smooth yellow to deep reddish-brown with a double wall, truncate base, and apical pore. Older spore measurements have varied considerably. Species from Australian collections appear to be more subglobose than those seen from the United States, raising the possibility that the latter are not the same species.

Organisation
It is an agaric, though it has lost hymenophoral organization and the ability to forcibly discharge its basidiospores and become "secotioid". Although considered by many to be a "stalked puffball", Podaxis pistillaris is more closely allied with the shaggy mane (Coprinus comatus) than with puffballs.

Uses
In Australia, it was used by many desert tribes to darken the white hair in old men's whiskers and for body painting. The fungus was presumably used by many desert Aborigines due to its distribution around drier areas of Australia. There are reports of its also being used as a fly repellent. Apart from the more common, ground-inhabiting Podaxis pistillaris, there is one other Podaxis species in Australia – Podaxis beringamensis, found on termite mounds; presumably both species were used.

The species is not poisonous, but is not commonly eaten.

Like many "puffballs," the species can be used to dye textiles, resulting in either a tan or a reddish hue.  It requires an alkaline base, and many home dyers use ammonia.  Urine was used in former times.

References

Agaricaceae
Inedible fungi
Fungi of Australia
Fungi of Hawaii
Secotioid fungi
Fungi without expected TNC conservation status